Csaba Körmöczi (28 February 1944 – 4 November 1992) was a Hungarian fencer. He competed in the team sabre event at the 1976 Summer Olympics.

References

External links
 

1944 births
1992 deaths
Hungarian male sabre fencers
Olympic fencers of Hungary
Fencers at the 1976 Summer Olympics
Martial artists from Budapest